Ponnagyun Township, formally known as Urittaung is a township of Sittwe District in the Rakhine State of Myanmar. The principal town is Ponnagyun. There are 94 village groups in this township and about 200 villages. It has an ancient pagoda Uritetawdat Zaydhi which was innovated by King Mengphaloung (1571–1593) of the Mrauk Oo Dynasty. It is 25 miles distance to the south Sittwe, the district capital.

History
Ponnagyun is a small town of Sittwe District in Arakan. It was formerly known as Urittaung City and it was suited in other side of present town of Ponnagyun closed to the bank of Kaladan river below to Sri Gututta Hill. The Urittaung city was the headquarters of the Arakan Navy in the 15th to 18th century Mrauk-Oo era. Arakan Kings controlled the Bay of Bengal and some parts of current Bangladesh by the power of Arakan Navy.

Geography

Demography

Ethnic group

Mainly Rakhinese are living. Some Burmese and Hind are there

Religion
Buddhist, Hindustan, Christian

Economy

Ponnagyun Township doesn't have big market. People are depending on Capital City, Sittwe. 30 % of people are government staff.

Transport

Ponnagyun is located on Yangon- Sittwe Main Road. The town pends on Road Transport. And the town is located on the close to Gisspanadi River.

Education
There are five high schools in Ponnagyun township.
BEHS,Ponnagyun
BEHS,Alechaung
BEHS,Yotayaut

References

Townships of Rakhine State
Sittwe